Manfred Wolke (born 14 January 1943 in Babelsberg, Brandenburg) is a German former welterweight boxer. He was a member of the Armeesportsklub Vorwärts Frankfurt an der Oder.

Wolke, representing East Germany, was the Welterweight Olympic gold medalist at the 1968 Mexico City Olympic Games. Wolke defeated Joseph Bessala of Cameroon on a 4-1 decision in the final. In 1972 he was knocked out by Cuba's Emilio Correa and didn't win a medal.

After his boxing career ended, Wolke became a trainer, most notably working with 1990s Heavyweight contender Axel Schulz and Henry Maske, and most recently with Francesco Pianeta.

1968 Olympic results
Below are the results of Manfred Wolke, a welterweight boxer from East Germany who competed at the 1968 Mexico City Olympics:

 Round of 64: bye
 Round of 32: defeated Andres Molina (Cuba) by decision, 4-1
 Round of 16: defeated Expedito Arrais (Brazil) by decision, 5-0
 Quarterfinal: defeated Celal Sandal (Turkey) by decision, 4-1
 Semifinal: defeated Vladimir Musalinov (Soviet Union) by decision, 3-2
 Final: defeated Joseph Bessala (Cameroon) by decision, 4-1 (won gold medal)

References

{{|url= http://amateur-boxing.strefa.pl/Championships/EuropeanChampionships1971.html}}

1943 births
Living people
Boxers at the 1968 Summer Olympics
Boxers at the 1972 Summer Olympics
Olympic boxers of East Germany
Olympic gold medalists for East Germany
Olympic medalists in boxing
Medalists at the 1968 Summer Olympics
German male boxers
Recipients of the Patriotic Order of Merit in silver
Recipients of the Banner of Labor
Sportspeople from Potsdam
Welterweight boxers